Cherry Shares was a high-yield investment program which claimed to generate a profit for its investors by engaging in arbitrage trading. The site offered several investment programs with varying timelines and rates of return. It was run by Brooksell Universal Limited, which was created on August 25, 2008.

Programs

Cherry Shares offered four different types of investment programs: a short-term, daily, medium-term, and long-term plan, all with high interest rates.

As of the weekend of December 4, 2010, CherryShares had stopped making payouts for members, according to many forums, blogs and social networking websites. After a series of payout problems with LibertyReserve, AlertPay and Bank Wires, finally, the CherryShares website had become inaccessible to all as of Friday 3 December 2010. The error message had first said, "502 Bad Gateway," then "504 Gateway Time-out". Some members claimed to have waited until Monday, December 6, before acknowledging that this was the end of "the mighty CherryShares program" (words used by Dane W. Wolf in an Oct. 16th email, "Big Announcement").

In subsequent weeks, attempts to log on to Cherry Shares was still producing the error message, "504 Gateway Time-out", while a new site appeared, one with many similar features that CS used to have. While CS had apparently marked its own lifetime with its description of the 75-week "investment horizon" of the long-term plan and its mandatory compounding, the new site pronounced a 25-week "investment horizon" and mandatory compounding for all 3 of its plans.

Management
The site said that Dane W. Wolf was the Managing Director of Cherry Shares. Denis Chan and Dominik Budlovsky were also listed as members of the Supporting Team. The CherryShares website went offline on Friday, December 3, 2010, and did not return.

It was also stated that Cherry Shares was run by a New Zealand company known as "Brooksell Universal Limited". However, while the New Zealand Companies Office has Brooksell in its registry, the only Director listed is Inta Bilder, who was not mentioned anywhere on the Cherry Shares site. Brooksell is fully owned by another New Zealand company, Interhold Limited, although that company was not mentioned on the Cherry Shares site, either.

Cherry Shares  had a headquarters address listed in Hong Kong. This address is a maildrop and hasn't been renewed since May 3, 2010.

Cherry Shares claimed that its transactions were "private" and exempt from American securities laws. It has commonly been called a "private investment pool", though it has also been described as being public.

Legality
The Hong Kong Securities and Futures Commission  issued an investor alert warning people about Cherry Shares.

References

Pyramid and Ponzi schemes